Egomaniac is the third studio album by South African rock band Kongos. It was released through Epic Records on June 10, 2016. Egomaniac is the first and last album signed with Epic Records. After the single "Take It from Me" was released, the label changed their minds and decided not to support the radio campaign, thus stopping the album's active promotion. Because of this, Kongos decided to stop working with the label, but it wasn't until two years later that the contract with Epic Records was terminated. John Joseph Kongos said, "We have already been suffocated by this label. It's killed a process of everything for us and we've lost energy in it. They have killed music for us."

Track listing

Personnel
Kongos
 Dylan Kongos - vocals, bass, lead guitar (3,10), synths (4,11), programming, backing vocals
Johnny Kongos - accordion, piano, synths, programming, vocals
 Jesse Kongos - drums, programming, vocals
 Danny Kongos - guitars, slide guitar, vocals

Charts

References

2016 albums
Epic Records albums
Kongos (band) albums